3006 or variant, may refer to:

In general
 A.D. 3006, a year in the 4th millennium CE
 3006 BC, a year in the 4th millennium BCE
 3006, a number in the 3000 (number) range

Roads numbered 3006
 Louisiana Highway 3006
 Pennsylvania Route 3006
 Texas Farm to Market Road 3006
 A3006 road (Great Britain)

Ships with pennant 3006
 , a World War II German U-boat
 , a World War I U.S. Navy troopship
 , a U.S. Navy cargo ship
 , a British Royal Navy landing ship

Weaponry
 §30.06 in Texas gun laws 
 .30-06 Springfield (7.62×63mm) or .30 Gov't '06 Winchester; a standard U.S. Army gun cartridge 
 .30-06 Springfield wildcat cartridges
 .30-06 JDJ

Other uses
 3006 Livadia, an asteroid in the Asteroid Belt, the 3006th asteroid registered

See also

 
 306 (disambiguation)